The seventh season of Laverne & Shirley, an American television sitcom series, began airing on October 13, 1981 on ABC. The season concluded on May 11, 1982 after 22 episodes.

The season aired Tuesdays at 8:30-9:00 pm (EST). It ranked 20th among television programs and garnered a 19.9 rating. The entire season was released on DVD in North America on February 4, 2014.

Overview
The season revolves around the titular characters Laverne DeFazio and Shirley Feeney and their friends in Burbank, California in 1966, however no longer with Betty Garrett as Edna Babish.

Cast

Starring
Penny Marshall as Laverne DeFazio
Cindy Williams as Shirley Feeney
Michael McKean as Leonard "Lenny" Kosnowski
David Lander as Andrew "Squiggy" Squiggman
Phil Foster as Frank DeFazio
Eddie Mekka as Carmine Ragusa
Leslie Easterbrook as Rhonda Lee

Guest Starring
Joey Heatherton as herself

Episodes

References

Laverne & Shirley seasons
1981 American television seasons
1982 American television seasons